The 2017–18 Campeonato Nacional da Guiné-Bissau season is the 41st edition (since independence) of the top level of football competition in Guinea-Bissau. It began on 25 November 2017 and ended on 18 June 2018.

Standings
Final table.

  1.Benfica de Bissau        24  14  7  3  38-19  49  Champions
  2.UDIB                     24  14  7  3  37-16  49
  3.FC Pelundo               24  10  6  8  23-27  36
  4.Nuno Tristão de Bula     24   9  8  7  33-26  35
  5.Portos de Bissau         24   8 10  6  25-22  34
  6.FC Cuntum                24   7 10  7  25-24  31
  7.Os Balantas de Mansôa    24   7  9  8  24-26  30
  8.Sporting da Guiné-Bissau 24   7  7 10  28-33  28
  9.Lagartos de Bambadinca   24   6  9  9  24-27  27
 10.Desportivo de Farim      24   6  8 10  23-30  26
 11.Flamengo FC de Pefine    24   6  7 11  22-30  25
 12.Sporting de Bafatá       24   6  6 12  21-30  24
 ---------------------------------------------------
 13.FC Canchungo             24   6  6 12  17-30  24  Relegated
  -.FC Sonaco                 excluded                Relegated

See also
2018 Taça Nacional da Guiné Bissau

References

Campeonato Nacional da Guiné-Bissau
Campeonato Nacional
Campeonato Nacional
Guinea-Bissau